"For All the Cows" (1995) is the third major single released by  Foo Fighters from their self-titled debut album Foo Fighters. It was only released in the United Kingdom and the Netherlands.

Music 
Kevin McKeough commented that the song fluctuated between "quiet, jazzy verses with explosive, Paul Bunyan-goes-jogging choruses".

Singles
Promo Single
"For All the Cows"

7" Blue Vinyl Single
"For All the Cows"
"Wattershed (Live at the Reading Festival 26 Aug 1995)"

CD Single
"For All the Cows"
"For All the Cows (Live at the Reading Festival 26 Aug 1995)"
"Wattershed (Live at the Reading Festival 26 Aug 1995)"

Chart positions

Other versions

A live version of the song, performed at the Reading Festival (26 August 1995) appears on the Big Me single, the bonus disc of the Australian edition of Foo Fighters, For All the Cows single and I'll Stick Around single.
An acoustic version of the song, performed at the Toshiba-EMI 3rd Studio (2 April 1997) appears on the Australian and Japanese versions of the My Hero single.
A live version of the song, performed at the Melkweg in Amsterdam (29 February 2000) appears on the Dutch edition (Live in Holland Disc 2) of the Next Year single and the One by One "special edition bonus disc."
Three live versions were released on the Everywhere but Home DVD, recorded in Toronto, the Black Cat in Washington D.C., and Reykjavik.

References

1995 singles
Foo Fighters songs
Songs written by Dave Grohl
1994 songs